Sir Sackville Crowe, 1st Baronet (7 December 1595 (baptised) – 27 October 1671) was an English politician.

He was born in Brasted Kent in around 1595. He later married one of the daughters of the Earl of Rutland; he had one son, also named Sackville, born around 1636 and who died in 1706. Early in 1617 he secured a reversionary lease of the former Perrot lordship of Laugharne from Charles, Prince of Wales which grant fell in on the death of the countess of Northumberland in April 1619 and he took up residence there.

He was a Member of Parliament for Hastings in the 1625 Parliament (the "Useless Parliament") and for Bramber in the 1628-9 Parliament. He was Treasurer of the Navy from 5 April 1627 to 21 January 1630; on 8 July 1627 he was created a baronet.  The King nominated Sir Sackville to be ambassador at Constantinople on 19 November 1633 during the personal rule. Royal instructions were delivered on 14 July 1638.

In 1636 he obtained a share of a lease on the Crown's ironworks in the Forest of Dean for twenty-one years, which he later tried to sell; this caused some great legal trouble, and had to be brought before Parliament.  Nonetheless, it did not prevent Sir Sackville sailing for Constantinople in October 1638.

He later served as the Ambassador to the Ottoman Empire; it is not recorded when he was sent to Constantinople, but in April 1642 the records of the House of Commons already mention objections being made to his "meddling" by the Levant Company. By 1646 they had progressed to formally requesting a letter of withdrawal be sent, citing his "seizing the Estates, and imprisoning the Factors and Servants, of the said Company, at Constantinople and Smyrna".  Crowe was recalled after nearly a decade by Parliament in January 1647.  Perhaps the ambassador had not received news of Royalist defeat because he did not finally depart until 23 November.

He was brought back in April 1648, as a prisoner in the ship Margaret and consigned to the Tower of London to await trial. In March 1652 he was bailed on a £2000 bond; by September 1658 the Levant Company had dropped all charges and he petitioned the Lords to annul his restraints.

References

 
 

1595 births
1671 deaths
Baronets in the Baronetage of England
Ambassadors of England to the Ottoman Empire
People from Brasted
17th-century English diplomats
17th-century Royal Navy personnel
English MPs 1625
English MPs 1628–1629
Prisoners in the Tower of London